Civil Service is the second studio album by underground hip-hop group Typical Cats. It was released on October 26, 2004, on Galapagos4. The lead single, "Easy Cause It Is", was released on September 2, 2004.

Track listing
"Can't Save" - 5:05
"Easy Cause It Is" - 4:12
"Typical Flows" - 4:33
"No Man Island" - 4:05
"Justice Coming" - 3:47
"12th Story" - 0:51
"The Trouble" - 4:39
"Drink Ticket" - 4:49
"Butterfly Knives" - 3:50
"The Do" - 3:13
"The Pavement" - 4:24
"Style Wars Theory" - 4:25
"Before Before" - 4:09

References

2004 albums